Aleksi Rutanen (born July 19, 1994) is a Finnish professional ice hockey Right Wing. He is currently playing with Espoo Blues in the Finnish Liiga.

Rutanen made his SM-liiga debut playing with Espoo Blues during the 2012–13 SM-liiga season.

References

External links

1994 births
Living people
Finnish ice hockey right wingers
Espoo Blues players
TuTo players
JYP Jyväskylä players
Sportspeople from Espoo